In Greek mythology, Thelxion was the fifth king of Sicyon who reigned for 52 years.

Family 
Thelxion was the son and heir of King Apis, descendant of the city's founder Aegialeus. He was the father of Aegyrus, who succeeded him in the throne.

Notes

References 

 Pausanias, Description of Greece with an English Translation by W.H.S. Jones, Litt.D., and H.A. Ormerod, M.A., in 4 Volumes. Cambridge, MA, Harvard University Press; London, William Heinemann Ltd. 1918. Online version at the Perseus Digital Library
 Pausanias, Graeciae Descriptio. 3 vols. Leipzig, Teubner. 1903.  Greek text available at the Perseus Digital Library.

Princes in Greek mythology
Mythological kings of Sicyon
Kings in Greek mythology
Sicyonian characters in Greek mythology